The 1981 GP Ouest-France was the 45th edition of the GP Ouest-France cycle race and was held on 24 August 1981. The race started and finished in Plouay. The race was won by Gilbert Duclos-Lassalle of the Peugeot team.

General classification

References

1981
1981 in road cycling
1981 in French sport
August 1981 sports events in Europe